Cas Odenthal (born 26 September 2000) is a Dutch professional footballer who plays as a defender for Italian  club Como.

Early and personal life
Odenthal was born in and grew up in Leersum and is the grandson of former Dutch international footballer Joop Odenthal.

Club career
After playing youth football for FC Utrecht, Odenthal signed for NEC Nijmegen in summer 2018. He made his debut for the club on 9 August 2019 in a 2–1 defeat to FC Eindhoven. In September 2019, Odenthal signed a contract with the club until summer 2021. In March 2021, his contract at the club was extended by a year. He made 29 appearances and scored one goal across the 2020–21 season as NEC were promoted to the Eredivisie.

On 26 July 2022, Odenthal signed a three-year contract with Como in Italy.

International career
Odenthal has represented the Netherlands at under-16 level.

References

External links

2000 births
Living people
Dutch footballers
Netherlands youth international footballers
People from Leersum
Footballers from Utrecht (province)
Association football defenders
NEC Nijmegen players
Como 1907 players
Eredivisie players
Eerste Divisie players
Serie B players
Dutch expatriate footballers
Expatriate footballers in Italy
Dutch expatriate sportspeople in Italy